Hrvatsko slovo was a weekly culture magazine from Zagreb. It was founded in 1995 by prominent Croatian writers Mile Pešorda, Dubravko Horvatić, Nedjeljko Fabrio, Stjepan Šešelj and Mile Maslać.

At the founding meeting in Zagreb, held on March 28, 1995, the concept of the new weekly magazine, presented by Dubravko Horvatić, was accepted, as well as  Milo Pešorda's proposal that the magazine bears the name Hrvatsko slovo. The first issue of Hrvasko Slovo was published in Zagreb on April 28, 1995 by its founders, writer Dubravko Horvatić, editor-in-chief, Stjepan Šešelj, director, Mile Pešorda, deputy editor-in-chief and editor for literature, and DHK president Nedjeljko Fabrio. One of the co-creators was the Croatian poet Mile Maslać, later deputy editor-in-chief of the newspaper.  The magazine published works of Hrvoje Hitrec, Zoran Tadić, Sven Lasta, Mirko Marjanović, Ljubica Štefan and many others.

Hrvatsko slovo has been discontinued on 11 February 2022, citing lack of financial support requested from the Ministry of Culture and Media.

Notable contributors
Many prominent Croatians have contributed to the magazine. 

Notable contributors from various fields, such writers, artists, scientists, as well as experts in various fields, include Vlado Andrilović, Ivan Aralica, Ivan Babić, Stjepan Sulek (editor-in-chief), Franjo Brkic, Emil Čić, Tomislav Dretar, Malkica Dugeč, Nela Eržišnik, Dubravko Horvatić, Marijan Krmpotić, Krešimir Mišak, Javor Novak, Mladen Pavković, Mile Pešorda, Zlatko Tomičić, Marijan Horvat-Mileković, Tomislav Sunić, Tin Kolumbić, Nevenka Nekic, Zvonimir Magdić, Ivan Sionić, Ivan Biondić, Branimir Souček, Zoran Vukman, Branka Hlevnjak, Igor Mrduljaš, Nenad Piskac, Esad Jogić, Lidija Bajuk, Zeljko Sabol, Ivan Boždar (alias Satir or wild man), Damir Pesord, Benjamin Tolić, Davor Dijanović, Ivica Luetić, Sanja Nikčević, Ati Salvaro and others.

Publishing 
Hrvatsko Slovo published by its own Library of Hrvasko Slovo, has published the works of these Croatian and other distinguished writers: Veljko Barbieri, Mirko Marjanović, Đurđica Ivanišević, Hrvoje Hitrec, Stjepan Šešelj, Igor Mrduljaš, Ljubica Štefan, Sven Lasta, Maja Freundlich, Dubravko Horvatić, Benjamin Tolić, Milan Vuković, Zoran Tadic, Mladen Rojnica, Mate Kovacevic, Pero Pavlović and others.

Awards created 
The magazine established two prizes: Dubravko Horvatić Prize (for prose and poetry) and Ljubica Štefan Prize (for historical and scientific contributions).

References

External links
 Official pages
 Hrvatsko slovo at the pages of Croatian Cultural Found

1995 establishments in Croatia
Magazines established in 1995
Magazines disestablished in 2022
Magazines published in Croatia
Mass media in Zagreb
Cultural magazines
Weekly magazines
Croatian-language magazines